Fuentes v. Shevin, 407 U.S. 67 (1972), was a case decided by the Supreme Court of the United States wherein petitioners challenged the constitutionality of the Uniform Commercial Code provisions of two states, Florida and Pennsylvania, which allowed for the summary seizure of a person's goods or chattels under a writ of replevin.  The statutes were challenged under the Fourteenth Amendment.  The Court held that the statutes acted as deprivations of plaintiff's property without due process.

The Court noted that seizure without notice and the opportunity for a hearing is acceptable only under limited circumstances:
     
 The seizure is necessary for an important public or government interest,
 There is a need for prompt action, and
 The seizure is initiated by an agent of the government.

These exceptions would apply (for example) when property is tainted food, misbranded drugs or unpaid taxes needed to fund a war.

See also
List of United States Supreme Court cases, volume 407
Kahn v. Shevin, 416 U.S. 351 (1974)
Nebraska v. One 1970 2-Door Sedan Rambler (Gremlin), Nebraskan case that cited this

External links
 

United States civil due process case law
United States Supreme Court cases
United States Supreme Court cases of the Burger Court
1972 in United States case law